Al Ekhbariya, El Ekhbariya, Alikhbariya, Alikhbaria, and other transliterations from Arabic: الإخبارية may refer to:

 Al Ekhbariya, Arabic news satellite TV channel based in Riyadh, Saudi Arabia
 alekhbariya.net, the website of Al Ekhbariya
 Syrian News Channel ( Al-Ikhbariyah)